The fifth season of the Pakistani music television series Coke Studio commenced airing on 13 May 2012. The season consisted of five episodes, which aired on 13 May, 27 May, 10 June, 24 June and 8 July respectively.

Rohail Hyatt and Umber Hyatt continued as producers of the show.

Artists

Featured Artist 
The fifth season saw the return of Bilal Khan, Fareed Ayaz & Abu Muhammad, Atif Aslam and Meesha Shafi, all artists having performed previously on Coke Studio. Folk singers Tahir Mithu and Chakwal group are also featured artists.  

Atif Aslam
Bilal Khan
Bohemia
Chakwal Group
Fareed Ayaz & Abu Mohammad
Farhan Rais Khan
Hadiqa Kiani
Hamayoon Khan
Meesha Shafi
Tahir Mithu
Overload
Qayaas
Rachel Viccaji
SYMT
Sanam Marvi
Uzair Jaswal

Backing Vocals 

Rachel Viccaji
Zoe Viccaji

House Band 
Among the houseband, Louis 'Gumby' Pinto left the show due to him being the executive producer of the show Uth Records by Ufone. Jaffer Ali Zaidi also left the show and was replaced by Mubashir Admani. Raheel Manzar Paul and Zulfiq 'Shazee' Ahmed Khan also left the show. Farhad Humayun was recruited as the new drummer for the fifth series.

Musician 

Asad Ahmed
Babar Ali Khanna
Farhad Humayun
Javed Iqbal
Kamran "Mannu" Zafar
Mubashir Admani
Omran "Momo" Shafique
Sikander Mufti

Guest Musician 

Sadiq Sameer

Production 
Speaking at the launch of Coke Studio Season 5, Rohail Hyatt said:

Episodes 
The webcast of fifth season began on 13 May 2012 and concluded on 8 July 2012. The season featured 5 episodes each episode with 5 songs, making a total of 25 songs. The show was produced at Rohail Hyatt's production company Frequency Media Pvt. Ltd and distributed by Coca-Cola Pakistan.

References

External links
 

Season05
2012 Pakistani television seasons